The title of honorary citizen is awarded by states or cities to foreign or internal individuals for their great contributions to the recognising state or city.

Honorary citizens of Macedonia
Tose Proeski

Honorary citizens of Skopje

Ivan Ribar
Josip Broz Tito
Władysław Gomułka
Josef Cirankievich
Olav V of Norway
U Thant
Mother Teresa
Frenk Munning
Umberto Vatani
Sharik Tarа
Christopher R. Hill
Lawrence Eagleburger
Thorvald Stoltenberg
Werner Trini
Filip Vujanović
Richard Neuheisel

Honorary citizens of Bitola
Ajri Demirovski

Honorary citizens of Kumanovo
Lawrence Butler (former American ambassador to Macedonia)
Louisa Vinton (former United Nations Resident Coordinator and UN Development Programme Resident Representative)

Honorary citizens of Ohrid
Ervan Fuere
Mincho Jordanov
Ljubčo Georgievski
Sidney Sheldon

Honorary citizens of Tetovo
Stjepan Mesic
Ramush Haradinaj.

Honorary citizens of Veles
Trifun Kostovski
Stiven Heins
Gjorgji Šoptrajanov

Honorary citizens of Strumicɑ
Goce Arnaudov

Honorary Citizens of Čair
Jozefina Topalli
Inva Mula
Recep Altepe
Ferid Murad

Honorary Citizens of Probištip
Vlado Jovanovski (Macedonian actor)

Honorary Citizens of Kićevo
Feridon Isiman (artist from North Cyprus)

Honorary Citizen of Delćevo
Katerina Trajkova Nurdjieva (nephew of Gotse Delchev) (2014)

Honorary Citizens of Kisela Voda
Boris Trajkovski

Honorary Citizens of Debar 
Nikolaus Knauf (2008)
Bamir Topi (2010)
Sali Berisha (2013) 
Petrit Bara (Albanian cardiothoracic surgeon) (2013)

Honorary Citizens of Novo Selo 
Robert Kirnak (Ambassador of Slovakia to Macedonia)

Honorary Citizens of Kriva Palanka
Milica Stojanova (Macedonian actress)

References

Lists of Macedonian people
North Macedonia
North Macedonia
Honorary citizen